Gottlob Ernst Schulze (23 August 1761 – 14 January 1833) was a German philosopher, born in Heldrungen (modern-day Thuringia, Germany). He was the grandfather of the pioneering biochemist Ernst Schulze.

Biography
Schulze was a professor at Wittenberg, Helmstedt, and Göttingen. His most influential book was Aenesidemus (1792), a skeptical polemic against Immanuel Kant's Critique of Pure Reason and Karl Leonhard Reinhold's Philosophy of the Elements.

In Göttingen, he advised his student Arthur Schopenhauer to concentrate on the philosophies of Plato and Kant. This advice had a strong influence on Schopenhauer's philosophy. In the winter semester of 1810 and 1811, Schopenhauer studied both psychology and metaphysics under Schulze.

Schulze died in Göttingen.

Quotes
"As determined by the Critique of Pure Reason, the function of the principle of causality thus undercuts all philosophizing about the where or how of the origin of our cognitions. All assertions on the matter, and every conclusion drawn from them, become empty subtleties, for once we accept that determination of the principle as our rule of thought, we could never ask, "Does anything actually exist which is the ground and cause of our representations?". We can only ask, "How must the understanding join these representations together, in keeping with the pre-determined functions of its activity, in order to gather them as one experience?"

References

1761 births
1833 deaths
18th-century essayists
18th-century German philosophers
18th-century philosophers
19th-century essayists
19th-century German male writers
19th-century German non-fiction writers
19th-century German philosophers
19th-century philosophers
Continental philosophers
Epistemologists
German male essayists
German male non-fiction writers
Metaphysicians
Ontologists
People from Kyffhäuserkreis
Philosophers of education
Philosophers of mind
Philosophers of psychology
Philosophers of science
Philosophy academics
Philosophy writers
Academic staff of the University of Göttingen
Academic staff of the University of Helmstedt
University of Wittenberg alumni
Academic staff of the University of Wittenberg